was a commuter airline serving visitors and residents of Sado Island, Niigata Prefecture, Japan. It commuted between Sado Island and Niigata Airport. The airline used Britten-Norman BN2 Islander aircraft for its services.

The airline ceased operations on October 1, 2008 due to financial difficulties.

References

External links

Kyokushin Air (Archive)

Defunct airlines of Japan
Regional airlines of Japan
Airlines disestablished in 2008
Companies based in Niigata Prefecture